John Edward Davis (born July 7, 1960) was a Republican member of the Texas House of Representatives from 1999-2015, representing House District 129 in Harris County.

References

1960 births
Living people
Politicians from Houston
Republican Party members of the Texas House of Representatives
21st-century American politicians